Diactenis is a genus of moths belonging to the subfamily Tortricinae of the family Tortricidae.

Species
Diactenis barbarae Diakonoff, 1957
Diactenis bidentifera Meyrick, 1928
Diactenis deformata Meyrick, 1928
Diactenis isotima Diakonoff, 1952
Diactenis orthometalla (Meyrick, 1922)
Diactenis plumula Diakonoff, 1952
Diactenis pteroneura Meyrick, 1907
Diactenis sequax Diakonoff, 1952
Diactenis thauma Diakonoff, 1952
Diactenis tryphera Common, 1965
Diactenis veligera Meyrick, 1928
Diactenis youngi Razowski, 2000

See also
List of Tortricidae genera

References

External links
tortricidae.com

Schoenotenini